Paul Taylor (born 20 December 1966) was a Scottish footballer who played for Dumbarton, Berwick Rangers and East Fife.

References

1966 births
Scottish footballers
Dumbarton F.C. players
East Fife F.C. players
Berwick Rangers F.C. players
Scottish Football League players
Living people
Association footballers not categorized by position